Sarah Kelly (born 1986) is an Irish international lawn bowler.

Bowls career
Sarah is a four times National champion after winning two pairs titles and two fours titles at the Irish National Bowls Championships. All four titles were won with her mother Noeleen Kelly being a member of the fours team and partner in the pairs. Sarah has also captained Ireland.

In 2020 she was selected for the 2020 World Outdoor Bowls Championship in Australia.

References

Female lawn bowls players from Northern Ireland
1986 births
Living people